Rihupisa Justus Kandando (born 12 July 1963 in Gobabis, Omaheke Region) is a Namibian politician. A member of the South West African National Union (SWANU), Kandando was the party's leader from 1998 until he was replaced by Usutuaije Maamberua.

References

1963 births
Living people
People from Gobabis
SWANU politicians
Namibian socialists
Alumni of the University of Surrey
Alumni of the University of Leeds
Academic staff of the University of Namibia